The first series of the Australian reality television series MasterChef Australia began on 27 April 2009 and aired on Network Ten, concluding on 19 July 2009 when Julie Goodwin was crowned the winner. The series was hosted by Sarah Wilson.

Contestants

Subsequent appearances 

 Julie Goodwin appeared on Series 2 as a guest judge for an invention test and for Masterclass.
 Poh Ling Yeow appeared on 1st Junior Series for a Masterclass.
 Andre Ursini appeared on Series 3 to give a lesson for Masterclass
 Julie again appeared on Series 4 to be a guest judge for a Mystery box Challenge.
 In a Special All Star Series for Charity, Julie and Poh took part along with Justine Schofield and Chris Badenoch. Poh came 7th, Julie came 5th, Justine came 4th & Chris came Runner Up.
 Joshua "Josh" Catalano appeared in the team challenge during "Wild West Week" of Series 5.
 Julie appeared at the first Mystery box challenge & Invention test of Series 6.
 In a Superstar themed week in Series 7 Poh appeared as a guest for a mystery box challenge and masterclass, while Justine appeared as a guest judge for an elimination challenge.
 In Series 10 Julie appeared to support the top 50 during auditions, Poh meanwhile appeared during South Australia week for a masterclass.
 Poh was a mentor during the immunity challenge in Series 11.
 Poh and Chris appeared in Series 12. Chris was eliminated on 10 May 2020, finishing in 18th and Poh was eliminated on 5 July 2020, finishing in 6th.
 Poh also appeared in Series 13 as guest judge for an elimination challenge. 
 In Series 14 Julie appeared for a chance to win the title for the 2nd time. Julie was eliminated on 5 July 2022, finishing in 5th.

Judges
 George Calombaris
 Gary Mehigan
 Matt Preston

Special guests
 Manu Feildel – Celebrity Chef Challenge 1
 Martin Boetz – Celebrity Chef Challenge 2
 Pete Evans – Celebrity Chef Challenge 3
 Frank Shek – Masterclass 3
 Alex Herbert – Celebrity Chef Challenge 4
 John Torode – Guest judge, Invention Test 4
 Guy Grossi – Celebrity Chef Challenge 5
 Ben O'Donoghue – Celebrity Chef Challenge 6
 Donovan Cooke/Tam Kin Pak – Celebrity Chef Challenge 8
 Emmanuel Stroobant – Celebrity Chef Challenge 9
 Adrian Richardson – Celebrity Chef Challenge 10
 Adriano Zumbo – Elimination Challenge 7
 Armando Percuoco – Guest judge, Formal Dinner Challenge
 Margaret Fulton – Guest judge, Formal Dinner Challenge
 Jacques Reymond – Guest judge, Formal Dinner Challenge
 Cheong Liew – Guest judge, Formal Dinner Challenge
 Luke Mangan – Guest judge, Finals Week Elimination Challenge 1
 Matt Moran – Celebrity Chef Challenge 7 & Guest judge, Finals Week Elimination Challenge 2
 Bill Granger – Guest judge, Finals Week Elimination Challenge 3
 Donna Hay – Guest judge, Finals Week Elimination Challenge 4
 Peter Kuruvita – Guest judge, Fresh Seafood Team Challenge
 Curtis Stone – Guest judge, Seafood Team Challenge, Grand Finale
Many of the guest chefs returned for the announcement of the winner, while Moran also presented a dish for the Pressure Test during the finale.

Elimination Chart

 In Week 1, nobody from the top 20 was eliminated. During this week the judges selected the twenty finalists from the top 50.
 In Week 2, nobody was eliminated after the Invention Test. Instead, the bottom 2 chefs had to clean up all the dishes from the challenge.
 In Week 4, Julia won the Celebrity Chef Challenge and a free pass till Finals Week
 In Week 5, nobody was eliminated after the pressure test challenge as judges chose to spare Sam and Trevor as the differences between the dishes were too trivial.
 In Week 5, the vote was tied 3 to 3 for Sandra and Kate. As Team Captain, the tiebreaking vote went to Kate. She voted to send herself home.
 In Week 7, Justine and Lucas won the Invention Test as a pair. However, only one of them was allowed to compete in the Celebrity Chef Challenge. Justine volunteered Lucas to go. Lucas won, and got a free pass till finals week 
 In Week 8, there was not a team challenge. Instead, the contestants competed in a wedding challenge. The top 4 performers advanced, whereas the bottom 2 performers went into a taste test elimination.
 In Week 9, the remaining chefs went to Hong Kong. In the Dim Sum Challenge, Sam won and elected to take Justine on his reward with him. In the High Tea/Rainbow Fish Challenge, contestants divided into groups of Justine/Julie/Andre and Chris/Sam. Julie won by outcooking finalist Lucas. In a pre-elimination challenge, Chris won immunity and won the power to select teams for elimination. He selected Justine/Julie and Sam/Andre. 
 In Week 10, Sam and Julie were the bottom 2 performers in the Invention Test, but were spared going into elimination. In a special Dream Restaurant Challenge, Chris won and received a reward. Former contestants Justine, Poh, and Tom returned to get a second chance. In a Navy canteen, everyone prepared a meal for 200 people, the 2 meals voted for the least, went into elimination. As the elimination challenge, Tom and Sam went into a taste test elimination.
 In Week 11, Justine and Julie won the Invention Test as a pair. However, only one of them was allowed to compete in the Celebrity Chef Challenge. Julie won a coin flip and won the right to compete against a Celebrity Chef.
 Poh and Julie competed against each other in three rounds consisting of a Taste Test, an Invention Test and a Pressure Test. Points would be earned for each test, with the winner decided based on the final tally after the three tests.

Episodes and ratings
 Colour key:
  – Highest rating during the series
  – Lowest rating during the series

Allegations of vote rigging
Large numbers of viewers have raised allegations that the voting on the series one finale of MasterChef was fraudulent after Julie Goodwin won the crown. After the show talkback radio had been inundated with calls, both for and against the verdict, and the finale also became a top trending topic on social networking site Twitter, where many users said they felt "deflated" and "ripped off" by the final episode of the hit show. Similar allegations were raised when contestants were eliminated throughout the series.
Judge Matt Preston has denied that eliminations were rigged or the result of a popularity contest, and asserted that Julie had won the title because she was the better cook on the night. Goodwin herself has also asserted that her victory was not the result of rigging, insisting that the professional integrity of the three judges would be damaged if it was.

References

2009 Australian television series debuts
2009 Australian television seasons
MasterChef Australia
Television shows filmed in Hong Kong